The 2015 Charnwood Borough Council election took place on 7 May 2015 to elect members of the Charnwood Borough Council in England. This was on the same day as other local elections.

References

2015 English local elections
May 2015 events in the United Kingdom
2015
2010s in Leicestershire